Alan Michael Clark Hutchison (26 February 1914 – 21 March 1993) was a Scottish politician. He served as a Member of Parliament for the Unionist Party and the Scottish Conservatives.

He was the son of George Clark Hutchison MP and brother of Ian Clark Hutchison MP.

Hutchison was educated at Eton College and Trinity College, Cambridge. He became a barrister, called to the bar at Gray's Inn in 1937. He was political officer and assistant secretary to the government of Aden 1948–54.

Hutchison contested Motherwell in 1955 and was Member of Parliament for Edinburgh South from a 1957 by-election to 1979, preceding Michael Ancram.

References

Times Guide to the House of Commons October 1974

External links 
 

1914 births
1993 deaths
Unionist Party (Scotland) MPs
Scottish Conservative Party MPs
UK MPs 1955–1959
UK MPs 1959–1964
UK MPs 1964–1966
UK MPs 1966–1970
UK MPs 1970–1974
UK MPs 1974
UK MPs 1974–1979
Members of the Parliament of the United Kingdom for Edinburgh constituencies
People educated at Eton College
English barristers